Riley Carl Mattson (born December 18, 1938) is a former American football offensive tackle in the National Football League for the Washington Redskins and the Chicago Bears.

1938 births
Living people
American football offensive tackles
Chicago Bears players
Oregon Ducks football players
Washington Redskins players
Players of American football from Portland, Oregon